A. bidentata may refer to:

 Acacia bidentata, a whistling thorn
 Achyranthes bidentata, a medicinal plant
 Acontia bidentata, an owlet moth
 Acteocina bidentata, a deepsea snail
 Alucita bidentata, a many-plumed moth
 Antheua bidentata, a prominent moth
 Antichthonidris bidentata, a South American ant
 Aphrophila bidentata, a crane fly
 Austromontia bidentata, a South African harvestman